Česen is a Slovene surname. Notable people with the surname include:
 Aleš Česen (born 1982), Slovenian mountaineer
 Tomo Česen (born 1959), Slovenian mountaineer

See also
 

Slovene-language surnames